This is a list of notable Indo-Trinidadians and Tobagonians.

Politics and government

Basdeo Panday
Kamla Persad-Bissesar
Noor Hassanali
Rudranath Capildeo
Simbhoonath Capildeo
Ramesh Maharaj
Bhadase Sagan Maraj
Roodal Moonilal
Adrian Cola Rienzi
Ashford Sinanan
Ranji Chandisingh
Dana Seetahal
Kenneth Lalla
Sarran Teelucksingh
George F. Fitzpatrick
Isaac Hyatali
Satnarine Sharma
Hardeo Hardath
Dana Seetahal
Isaac Hyatali
Kamaluddin Mohammed

Literature

Neil Bissoondath
Vahni Capildeo
Ismith Khan
Seepersad Naipaul
Shiva Naipaul
V. S. Naipaul
Kenneth Vidia Parmasad
Lakshmi Persaud
Arnold Rampersad
Kris Rampersad
Kenneth Ramchand
Rabi Maharaj
Harold Sonny Ladoo
Shani Mootoo
Bhaskar Sunkara

Sports

Samuel Badree
Denesh Ramdin
Ravi Rampaul
Manny Ramjohn
Sunil Narine
Daren Ganga
Hermat Gangapersad
Robin Singh
Adrian Barath
Inshan Ali
Rayad Emrit
Rangy Nanan
Sonny Ramadhin
Rajindra Dhanraj
Amit Jaggernauth
Ishwar Maraj
Suruj Ragoonath
Dinanath Ramnarine
Charran Singh
Subhash Gupte
Greg Ranjitsingh
Anisa Mohammed
Nicholas Pooran
Gopaul Sahadeo
Kendall Jagdeosingh
Ria Ramnarine
Vikash Mohan
Dave Mohammed
Capil Rampersad
Rajesh Latchoo
Aditi Soondarsingh
Amarnath Basdeo
Donald Ramsamooj

Arts and entertainment
Sundar Popo
Sam Boodram
Ravi Bissambhar
Rikki Jai
Rakesh Yankaran
Parvati Khan
Heeralal Rampartap
Adesh Samaroo
Drupatee Ramgoonai
Jit Samaroo
Neeshan Prabhoo
Lakshmi Singh
Gerry Bednob
Errol Sitahal
Chris Bisson
Valene Maharaj
Ian Hanomansing
Ira Mathur
Wendy Rahamut
Lennox Mohammed
Surujpat Mathura
Kimberly Farrah Singh
Chandini Chanka
Dominic Kallipersad
Shelly Dass
Niala Boodhoo
Al Ramsawack
John Agitation
Valiama Narain

Science, medicine, and health
Rajendra Persaud
Krishan Kumar
Lall Ramnath Sawh
Jean Ramjohn-Richards
Sandra Ramdhanie
Ria Persad
Anna Mahase
Stella Abidh
Joan Latchman
Rudranath Capildeo

Business, economics, and finance
 Krishna Maharaj
 Haji Gokool Meah
Reema Harrysingh-Carmona
 Sarran Teelucksingh
Avinash Persaud
 Mahaboob Ben Ali
 Helen Bhagwansingh
Sayeed Khan
Aaron Matthew Beharry

Religion, philanthropy, and philosophy
Bhadase Sagan Maraj
Pt. Dr. Rampersad Parasram
Satnarayan Maharaj
Anantanand Rambachan
Simbhoonath Capildeo
Capildeo family
Sahadeo Tiwari
Rabi Maharaj
Imran N. Hosein
Haji Gokool Meah

Military
Kareem Rashad Sultan Khan, U. S. soldier

Criminals

Dole Chadee (born Nankissoon Boodram)
Annie Dookhan
Boysie Singh

References

 
 
Indo-Trinidadian
Indo-Trinidadians and Tobagonians